Raymond William Monaco (February 10, 1918 – December 7, 2002) was an American football guard in the National Football League for the Washington Redskins and the Cleveland Rams.  He attended Holy Cross.

1918 births
2002 deaths
Players of American football from Providence, Rhode Island
American football offensive guards
Washington Redskins players
Cleveland Rams players
Wilmington Clippers players